The tropical scrubwren or Beccari's scrubwren (Sericornis beccarii) is a bird species. Placed in the family Pardalotidae in the Sibley-Ahlquist taxonomy, this has met with opposition and indeed is now known to be wrong; they rather belong to the independent family Acanthizidae.

It is found in tropical moist forests of northern Australia, Indonesia, and Papua New Guinea.

Taxonomy
Sericornis beccarii includes the following subspecies:
 S. b. wondiwoi – Mayr, 1937
 S. b. beccarii – Salvadori, 1874
 S. b. weylandi – Mayr, 1937
 S. b. idenburgi – Rand, 1941
 S. b. cyclopum – Hartert, 1930
 S. b. randi – Mayr, 1937
 S. b. minimus – Gould, 1875
 S. b. dubius – Mayr, 1937

References

Sericornis
Birds described in 1874
Taxa named by Tommaso Salvadori
Taxonomy articles created by Polbot